Freebird... The Movie is an in-depth look at Southern rock band, Lynyrd Skynyrd. Released on August 30, 1996, it is part documentary and part concert footage. Charlie Daniels was involved as "creative consultant".

Performances
Most of the footage is from the band's appearance at the Knebworth festival, on August 21, 1976, while the last performance is from a show in Oakland, California.

Promotion
In 1996, they offered a performance to promote the documentary. Bob Burns (who had left Lynyrd Skynyrd in December 1974 due to drumming fatigue) reunited with the band for the performance.

Soundtrack
A soundtrack of the film was released by MCA Records, including most of the recordings of the performances from the film. However, the soundtrack omits "Gimme Back My Bullets" and "Cry For The Bad Man," both of which were included in the film and recorded on 3/7/76 at Bill Graham's Winterland Ballroom in San Francisco, CA

"Workin' for MCA" (Ed King, Ronnie Van Zant)
"I Ain't the One" (Gary Rossington, Ronnie Van Zant)
"Saturday Night Special" (Ed King, Ronnie Van Zant)
"Whiskey Rock-A-Roller" (Ed King, Billy Powell, Ronnie Van Zant)
"Travelin' Man" (Leon Wilkeson, Ronnie Van Zant)
"Searchin'" (Allen Collins, Ronnie Van Zant)
"What's Your Name?" (Gary Rossington, Ronnie Van Zant)
"That Smell" (Allen Collins, Ronnie Van Zant)
"Gimme Three Steps" (Allen Collins, Ronnie Van Zant)
"Call Me the Breeze" (J.J. Cale)
"T for Texas (Blue Yodel No.1)" (Jimmie Rodgers)
"Sweet Home Alabama" (Ed King, Gary Rossington, Ronnie Van Zant)
"Free Bird" (Allen Collins, Ronnie Van Zant)
"Dixie" (Traditional)

Recording Dates/Locations
Tracks 7-8 recorded 7/13/1977 at the Convention Center in Asbury Park, NJ
Track 13 recorded 7/2/1977 at the Day on the Green, Oakland Coliseum in Oakland, CA
All other tracks recorded 8/21/1976 at the Knebworth Festival in Hertfordshire, England

External links 
 

Rockumentaries
1996 soundtrack albums
1996 films
Lynyrd Skynyrd live albums
1996 live albums
Documentary film soundtracks
1990s English-language films